Amitabha Buddhist Centre is a Buddhist institution in Geylang, Singapore. It is affiliated with the Foundation for the Preservation of the Mahayana Tradition (FPMT), an international non-profit organisation, founded by Lama Thubten Yeshe.

Origins
Amitabha Buddhist Centre was founded by Lama Thubten Yeshe when he first visited Singapore with his disciple Thubten Zopa Rinpoche in 1984. After Lama Yeshe died in 1984, Lama Thubten Zopa Rinpoche became its Spiritual Director. The Singapore centre was finally realised in 1985, but had no permanent base. Its followers met in various venues such as Dharma Cakra Society and Cheng Beng Buddhist Society.

In 1987, Lama Zopa sent Venerable Thubten Chodron, an American Buddhist nun to Singapore as its Resident Teacher. Before coming to Singapore, she taught Buddhism and meditation in countries like United States, Europe and Hong Kong. She taught in Singapore for over a year, teaching in schools as well as at different Buddhist societies. She also published several books such as Working with Anger, Open Heart, Clear Mind, Buddhism for Beginners et cetera.

In 1988, the group decided to organise as a Buddhist society under the name "Amitabha Buddhist Centre", and leased a small house at Butterfly Avenue for its activities. Amitabha Buddhist Centre was officially registered in January 1989. In 2000, ABC began to raise funds for the purchase a permanent home at Lorong 15 Geylang. In 2004, they began to build a new seven-storey Tibetan-style structure at nearby Lorong 25A. It was completed in mid-2006.

Visits from Tulkus
On 26 May 1991, Tulku Tenzin Ösel Rinpoche, a 6-year old Spanish boy, visited Singapore to join members of Amitabha Buddhist Centre for Vesak celebrations. When he was seven months old, this boy had appeared in a dream of a close disciple of Lama Yeshe. The disciple sought him out, and the boy was later officially confirmed as the reincarnation of Lama Yeshe by the Dalai Lama. The boy's story is the subject of Reincarnation: The Boy Lama by Vicki Mackenzie.

On 16 April 2007, 4-year old Tulku Tenzin Phuntsok Rinpoche, dubbed the "Little Lama" by devotees, visited Singapore and Amitabha Buddhist Centre. More than 10,000 people from all walks of life, including some Christians and Hindus, sought blessings from Phuntsok Rinpoche. He is the reincarnation of Geshe Lama Konchog, confirmed by the Dalai Lama in December 2005.

Present day
The current resident teacher at Amitabha Buddhist Centre is Khen Rinpoche Geshe Chonyi, and the centre bears an affiliation with the Foundation for the Preservation of the Mahayana Tradition (FPMT).

See also
Buddhism in Singapore

References

External links 

 Official website

Bibliography
 
 
 
 
 
 

Buddhist temples in Singapore
Chinese-Singaporean culture
Religious organizations established in 1985
Geylang
Tibetan Buddhism in Asia
1985 establishments in Singapore